is a former Japanese football player.

Playing career
Naito was born in Ishikawa Prefecture on December 18, 1970. After graduating from Shizuoka Gakuen High School, he played Yokohama Flügels. He played many matches in 1992 J.League Cup. However he could not play at all in the match in 1993. Although he debuted in J1 League in April 1994, he could only play this match in 1994 season. In 1995, he moved to Japan Football League club Vissel Kobe. The club won the 2nd place in 1996 and was promoted to J1 League. Although he played many matches, he retired end of 1997 season.

Club statistics

References

External links

1970 births
Living people
Association football people from Ishikawa Prefecture
Japanese footballers
J1 League players
Japan Football League (1992–1998) players
Yokohama Flügels players
Vissel Kobe players
Association football midfielders